Afra and Tobia Scarpa are award winning postmodern Italian architects and designers. Their pieces can be found in museums across the United States and Europe, including collections in MoMA and the Louvre Museum. They have collaborated with companies such as B&B Italia, San Lorenzo Silver, and Knoll International. They have won a number of awards such as the Compasso d'Oro in 1969 to the International Forum Design in 1992. Their design work consists of architecture and everyday household items including, furniture, clothing, interior design, art glass. They focused on the technical and aesthetic possibilities of materials in their designs. The couple was greatly influenced by Tobia’s father, Carlo Scarpa, a Venetian architect and designer.

Life and work
Afra Bianchin was born in Montebelluna, Italy in 1937 and Tobia Scarpa was born in Venice, Italy in 1935. Both Afra and Tobia Scarpa earned degrees in architecture from the Università Iuav di Venezia in 1957. 

From 1957 to 1961, Tobia worked as a glass designer at the Murano glassworks of Venini, and then in 1960 the two artists opened their own design office in Montebelluna. They designed for Gavina (sofa "Bastiano" 1961), and then followed with a series of projects with several other companies. Their more notable works were made for B&B Italia (sofa "Coronado" 1966), Cassina (armchair "Soriana" 1968), and Meritalia (chair "Libert" 1989). 

In 1964, they collaborated with Benetton clothing company to design the firm's first textile factory. Afra and Tobia Scarpa have been responsible for the interiors of the company’s Paris, Freiburg, and New York City offices. 

In 1973 they designed the "Papillion" lamp for Flos, one of the first lighting designs to use halogen technology. They also worked for Fabbian (lamps "Saturnina" 1998 and "Galeto" 2001), and Veas (metal lamp "Scandola") in the later part of their careers. From their first collaborations as husband and wife in the mid-1950s until the present day, their pieces have incorporated new technologies, while still maintaining history, form, and function.

Afra and Tobia Scarpa have received the Compasso d'Oro in 1969 to the International Forum Design in 1992. Their furniture has been published in magazine articles like L'ŒIL. From 2004 to 2007, the couple collaborated on many restoration projects for historical buildings such as the Palazzo della Ragione in Verona, Italy. 

Since 2002, Tobia has taught in the Design Department of the Università Iuav di Venezia in Venice, Italy.
Tobia Scarpa has always believed in design being a profession without a rule book. His timeless creations, including the likes of Fantasma and Foglio, are a true representation of both – his design philosophies and his unmatched mastery over the craft.

Work with Benetton
Their collaboration with Benetton began in 1964, with the design of the firm's first factory. Since then, Afra and Tobia Scarpa have been responsible for all the industrial architecture of the Group. Some of the contributions to Benetton are:
 Project for the Benetton shops in 1966
 Restoration of the Villa Minelli in 1972 
 Jeans factory at Cusignana in 1973 
 The automated and robotized distribution center at Castrette in 1980 
 Benetton offices in Paris and Freiburg in 1980
 The wool division factory at Castrette in 1985 
 The Benetton office in New York in 1986
 Rebuilt, with a change in its use, the first factory at Ponzano Veneto in 1987 
 Restoration of the Villa Minelli and its surroundings at Ponzano in 1989
 The clothing factory in 1993 (doubled in 1995) in Castrette di Villorba (Treviso)

Work with Molteni 
Their collaboration with Molteni began in 1973 with the design of the Monk dining chair. Since then, Afra and Tobia Scarpa have designed a significant number of furniture for the Italian brand throughout two decades. Not all of them are still in production, but everyone is a piece of Italian design history.

Some of the furniture designed for Molteni are:

 Monk chair, 1973
 Morna bed, 1973
 Mop bookcase, 1974
 Mastro chair, 1980
 Meo chair, 1980
 Miss chair, 1986

Awards 
 Afra and Tobia Scarpa received the Compasso d’Oro award in 1970 
 They received honorary recognition for the same prize in 1979
 They won the Nerocon Merit Award in 1982
 The Primer Premio Nacional de Diseño Otorgado in 1978
 The Auszeichnung für hohe Designqualität in 1992
 The International Forum Design Hanover award in 1992 
 Tobia Scarpa won the career Compasso d’Oro award in 2008

Museums that have Featured the Scarpas’ Work
 Museum of Modern Art in New York 
 National Museum of Design, New York 
 Philadelphia Museum of Art
 Museum of Contemporary Art, Chicago 
 La Jolla Museum of Contemporary Art
 Musée du Louvre, Paris 
 Staats Museum, Munich 
 Österreichisches Museum für Angewandte Kunst Wein, Vienna 
 Victoria and Albert Museum, London
 Louisiana Museum of Modern Art, Denmark
 Kunstindustrimuseet, Copenhagen 
 Galleri Jerome, Copenhagen
 Galleri Asbaek, Copenhagen 
 Museum für Kunst und Gewerbe Hamburg 
 Staatliches Museum für Angewandte Kunst, Munich 
 Design-Zentrum, Essen
 Museum für Angewandte Kunst (Cologne)
 Cooper Hewitt, Smithsonian Design Museum

Clients
 Gavina (sofa "Bastiano" 1961)
 B & B Italia (sofa "Coronado" 1966)
 Cassina S.p.A. (armchair "Soriana" 1968)
 Meritalia (chair "Libert" 1989)
 Flos (lamps "Papillona 1977 and "Pierrot" 1990)
 Casas (chair "Veronica" 1991)
 Fabbian (lamps "Saturnina" 1998 and "Galeto" 2001)
 Veas (metal lamp "Scandola")
 Cadel
 Dimensione Fuoco 
 Molteni
 Poggi
 San Lorenzo
 Knoll International
 Goppion
 IB Office
 Maxalto
 Stildomus 
 Unifor

References

Art duos
Italian designers
Architects from Veneto
Living people
Italian artists
Year of birth missing (living people)
Compasso d'Oro Award recipients